Trilophosuchus ("Triple Crest Crocodile") is an extinct genus of mekosuchine crocodilian from Australia. Unlike living crocodilians, it is hypothesized to have been terrestrial. It had a short skull with three ridges on top and large eyes. Fossils have been found at Riversleigh in north-western Queensland, and are Miocene in age. Only a single species has been described, the type species T. rackhami.

Discovery

Trilophosuchus is known from a posterior portion of the skull, QM F16856, the holotype specimen. Several other isolated bones of the skull were found. The material was collected from the Ringtail Site of the Gag Plateau in Riversleigh, one of Australia's most famous fossil localities. The skull was uncovered in 1985 during an excavation by the University of New South Wales. The deposit in which Trilophosuchus were found are Early Miocene in age, roughly 20 million years old. The deposit, known as System C, is the youngest of the Oligocene-Miocene sequences at Riversleigh. The genus Trilophosuchus was erected in 1993 with the description of the remains by Paul Willis of the University of New South Wales in the Journal of Vertebrate Paleontology.

Description
Trilophosuchus had a short, deep skull and relatively large eyes. Because of its small size, Trilophosuchus resembles the living dwarf crocodile, Osteolaemus, and caiman, Paleosuchus. It also resembles earlier crocodyliforms such as the notosuchians, atoposaurids, and protosuchians. Being a mekosuchine, Trilophosuchus was not closely related to any of these forms and likely acquired a short snout and small body through evolutionary convergence.

In addition to its small size and short snout, Trilophosuchus has several unique characteristics, or autapomorphies, that distinguish it from other crocodylians. A posterior dentary tooth of the lower jaw passes between the sixth and seventh maxillary teeth of the upper jaw, leaving a deep groove in the maxilla. The palatal fenestrae, two openings in the palate, reach up to the level of the sixth maxillary teeth. The palatine bone has an anterior process, or projection, that reaches to the level of the fourth maxillary teeth. Behind the palatine and the palatal fenestra, there are large pterygoids and ectopterygoids that project posteriorly and extend below the skull. The jugal bones, which line the side of the skull below the eyes, project laterally to form prominent ridges. The supratemporal fenestrae, two holes on the skull table, are long and narrow. There are also three ridges running longitudinally on the skull table, giving the genus its name, which means "triple-crested crocodile" in Greek.

The occipital or posterior surface of the skull has structures for the insertion of muscles that would have held the head above the body.

Classification

Despite its resemblance to early crocodyliforms such as protosuchians and notosuchians, Trilophosuchus is an advanced crocodylian. It possesses a postorbital bar behind the eye socket that is depressed into the skull, a derived feature of the clade Neosuchia. It can be united with the eusuchians because its internal nares are contained within the pterygoid bones and the teeth extend behind the level of the anterior edges of the palatal fenestrae. Based on several distinctive characteristics and characteristics shared with other crocodylians, Trilophosuchus was initially found to be the most basal of the known mekosuchines. More recently, older mekosuchines such as Kambara have been found in Australia that are more basal than Trilophosuchus. Later phylogenetic studies have placed Trilophosuchus as a more derived mekosuchine, more closely related to younger forms such as Quinkana and Mekosuchus. It has been placed in the derived mekosuchine clade Mekosuchini to distinguish it from more basal taxa such as Kambara and Australosuchus.

The below cladogram showing the placement of Trilophosuchus within Mekosuchinae is from a 2018 tip dating study by Lee & Yates that simultaneously used morphological, molecular (DNA sequencing), and stratigraphic (fossil age) data to better establish the inter-relationships within Crocodilia:

Paleobiology
Trilophosuchus is representative of an early Cenozoic radiation of mekosuchines in Australia. Other mekosuchines that lived in Australia at the time included Pallimnarchus, Australosuchus, and Quinkana. Pallimnarchus and Australosuchus were broad-snouted, generalized crocodylians, while Quinkana was ziphodont, meaning it had a deep snout. Trilophosuchus is unusual among mekosuchines, and crocodilians in general, in that it had a short-deep snout and an arboreal lifestyle. It represented a third adaptive type in the early radiation of Australian mekosuchines. All of these early mekosuchines were terrestrial, unlike their semiaquatic crocodile relatives.

The paleoecology of Trilophosuchus is difficult to determine because of a poor understanding of the ecology of the living crocodilians that have the most similar appearance to the genus: Paleosuchus and Osteolaemus. Both genera are semiaquatic, and have been proposed to inhabit small streams in closed-canopy forests, fast-flowing streams, larger, slow moving rivers, and lakes. While Paleosuchus and Osteolaemus are the most similar living crocodlylians to Trilophosuchus, Trilophosuchus more closely resembles early crocodyliforms such as notosuchians and protosuchians that were entirely terrestrial.

In the first description of Trilophosuchus, Paul Willis tentatively considered the genus to be terrestrial, because most other extinct crocodyliforms with short snouts and laterally directed eyes were terrestrial. The arrangements of the neck muscles of Trilophosuchus, evidenced by the shape of the occipital portion of the skull, suggests that it held its head high, a posture more suitable for a terrestrial rather than semiaquatic lifestyle. Compared to living animals, Trilophosuchus probably had a posture more like monitor lizards than crocodiles. The short length of its snout, contrasting with the longer snouts of larger carnivorous crocodylians such as Pristichampsus, suggests that Trilophosuchus restricted its diet to smaller prey. It may have consumed fish, turtles, snakes, and small mammals, all of which have been found from Riversleigh. The neck musculature of Trilophosuchus may have enabled it to make rapid movements of the head when feeding, up and down, side to side, and rotationally.

It has been suggested by Paul Willis that the mekosuchine Mekosuchus inexpectatus was arboreal, given its small size. An arboreal lifestyle is otherwise unknown in crocodyliforms. Given that Trilophosuchus is similar in appearance to M. inexpectatus, it has often been suggested that it too was arboreal. Mekosuchus inexpectatus has a limb bone structure that may be compatible with an arboreal lifestyle, but there is no evidence for climbing abilities in Trilophosuchus. Because of the lack of evidence, an arboreal lifestyle is not agreed upon by other paleontologists.

References

Mekosuchinae
Miocene crocodylomorphs
Terrestrial crocodylomorphs
Riversleigh fauna
Fossil taxa described in 1993
Crocodiles of Australia
Prehistoric pseudosuchian genera